Alessandro di Sangro (died 18 February 1633) was a Roman Catholic prelate who served as Archbishop of Benevento (1616–1633) and Titular Patriarch of Alexandria (1604–1633)

Biography
On 2 August 1604, Alessandro di Sangro was appointed during the papacy of Pope Clement VIII as Titular Patriarch of Alexandria and ordained a priest on 8 August 1604 by Leonard Abel, Titular Bishop of Sidon. On 10 August 1604, he was consecrated bishop by Camillo Borghese, Cardinal-Priest of San Crisogono, with Fabio Biondi (bishop), Titular Patriarch of Jerusalem, and Giuseppe Ferrerio, Archbishop of Urbino, serving as co-consecrators. On 2 May 1616, he was appointed during the papacy of Pope Paul V as Archbishop of Benevento. On 2 Apr 1621, he was appointed during the papacy of Pope Gregory XV as Apostolic Nuncio to Spain, position he held until 23 Jun 1622. He served as Archbishop of Benevento until his death on 18 February 1633.

Episcopal succession

References

External links and additional sources
 (for Chronology of Bishops) 
 (for Chronology of Bishops) 
 (for Chronology of Bishops) 
 (for Chronology of Bishops) 

17th-century Italian Roman Catholic archbishops
Bishops appointed by Pope Clement VIII
Bishops appointed by Pope Paul V
Bishops appointed by Pope Gregory XV
1630 deaths
Apostolic Nuncios to Spain